is a 2005 Japanese film directed by Nobuhiro Yamashita. It stars Bae Doona, Aki Maeda, Yu Kashii, and Shiori Sekine (of the band Base Ball Bear) as teenagers who form a band to cover songs by the Japanese punk rock band the Blue Hearts; the film's title comes from the hit Blue Hearts song "Linda Linda". An English-subtitled DVD was released on May 8, 2007. The band, Paranmaum (Korean for "the Blue Hearts"), released a CD single in Japan and Korea: We Are Paranmaum., containing three songs that they perform in the movie and three other songs.

Plot
A group of schoolgirls has formed a band to perform at their high school cultural festival in three days' time, but the guitarist and singer have quit. The remaining members, Kei, Kyoko, and Nozomi, decide to perform covers of Blue Hearts songs, including "Linda Linda", but need a new singer. They ask the first girl that walks by, Son, a Korean exchange student who is not fluent in Japanese, and name their band Paranmaum. The first day ends with all the girls working their hardest to learn their parts. Son practices at a karaoke parlor, and Kyoko talks to her crush, Kazuya.

The next day, the girls begin practicing early at school. When they regroup after school, Kyoko arrives late and they miss their time slot. Kei calls her ex-boyfriend and arranges some practice time in a studio. They leave late at night to return to school and continue practicing through the rest of the night.

By the next morning, Paranmaum is well rehearsed. As school begins, the girls go to their respective places to help during the festival. Kei practices her guitar parts and talks to her rocker friend Takako. Son is supposed to help with the Japan-Korea culture exchange, but daydreams about the band. Kyoko sells crepes and Nozomi falls asleep on her bass guitar in a classroom.

Kei and Kyoko wake up Nozomi and fetch Son. Son rebuffs a schoolmate's confession of love. Over dinner at Nozomi's house, the girls persuade Kyoko to talk to her crush Kazuya before the performance the next day. They end the night back at school, practicing until early morning.

On the day of the performance, Paranmaum returns to the studio to practice. Exhausted, they fall asleep. Kei dreams about being celebrated and performing for the Ramones at the Budokan. At the school, the stage managers search for the band, but to no avail; to pass the time, their friends Takako and Moe perform impromptu music. Kei is woken by Kyoko's cell phone when Oe calls to ask where Kyoko is. The band rushes back to school in a taxi. Kyoko meets Kazuya while the band sets up minutes before the performance. Kyoko finally arrives and Paranmaum performs to an excited crowd.

Cast
Main (Paranmaum band)
 Bae Doona - Son, the vocalist of Paranmaum, a Korean exchange student.
 Aki Maeda - Kyoko Yamada, the drummer of Paranmaum band.
 Yuu Kashii - Kei Tachibana, the guitarist of Paranmaum band (formerly a keyboardist).
 Shiori Sekine - Nozomi Shirakawa, the bassist of Paranmaum band.
Supporting
 Katsuya Kobayashi - Kazuya Oe, Kyoko's crush.
 Takayo Mimura - Rinko Marumoto, former vocalist of the girl's band.
 Shione Yukawa - Moe Imamura, former guitarist of the girl's band.
 Yuko Yamazaki - Takako Nakajima, Kei's rocker friend.
 Keisuke Koide - Abe, the leader of the school's music club.
 Masaki Miura - Tomoki Maezono, Kei's ex-boyfriend.
 Masahiro Komoto - Teacher Koyama, in charge of the music club.
 Kenichi Matsuyama - Makihara, a schoolboy that has a crush on Son.
 Lily - Kei's mother.

Reception
Linda Linda Linda has an 82% approval rating on Rotten Tomatoes and a 71/100 average on Metacritic. The film was David Ehrlich's choice for IndieWire's 2018 list of the best Japanese films of the 21st century, with Ehrlich suggesting that it isn't as profound as films like Spirited Away (2001), Millennium Actress (2001), and Nobody Knows (2004), but still praising it as "euphorically fun [...] so rich, so charismatic, and so damn catchy, you’ll be itching to show it to all your friends."

Soundtrack

The soundtrack was released on July 20, 2005. The original instrumental tracks were composed by James Iha of the Smashing Pumpkins. The vocal tracks include Paranmaum (the band from the movie) singing covers of the Blue Hearts songs "Linda Linda", "Boku no Migite (My Right Hand)" and "Owaranai Uta (Never Ending Song)". Kashii and Maeda learned to play their instruments specially for this movie. There are also two songs by Base Ball Bear (the band Shiori Sekine belongs to in reality); they are "Sayonara Nostalgia" and "April Mirage". These two songs can be heard playing in the "crêpe shop" scenes featuring Kyoko and Oe Kazuya. Shione Yukawa (who plays Moe Imamura in the movie) and Yuko Yamazaki (from the band me-ism) also perform a few songs on stage at the festival itself.

References

External links

Official site for US release
Announcement of US licensing

 
 

2005 films
2000s Japanese-language films
2000s teen comedy-drama films
Teen musical films
2000s musical comedy-drama films
Films directed by Nobuhiro Yamashita
Japanese high school films
2005 comedy films
2005 drama films
Japanese musical comedy-drama films
Zainichi Korean culture
2000s Japanese films